Chichagluy-e Mansur (also Romanized as Chīchaglūy-e Manşūr; also known as Chīchaklū-ye Manşūr) is a village in Bash Qaleh Rural District, in the Central District of Urmia County, West Azerbaijan Province, Iran. At the 2006 census, its population was 264, in 66 families.

References 

Populated places in Urmia County